The Salonpas Cup (sometimes called Torneio Internacional de Vôlei Feminino or Women's Volleyball International Cup) created by DeBrito Propaganda for Hisamitsu Pharmaceutical is an international women's volleyball club cup competition played annually in Brazil by clubs from several countries, supported by the Brazilian Volleyball Confederation and recognized by FIVB (Fédération Internationale de Volleyball). The competition is named after Salonpas, a product made by the Japanese company Hisamitsu Pharmaceutical Co. Inc, which is the tournament's sponsor.

Competition format
In 2008, the six participating clubs play against each other once. The four best placed teams qualify to the semifinals, when the first placed team play against the fourth placed team and the second placed team play against the third placed team. The winners play the final and the losers plays the third-place playoff.

Participating teams
Below is a list of the participating teams, year by year:

2001 edition

2002 edition

2003 edition

2004 edition

2005 edition

2006 edition

2007 edition

2008 edition

List of champions

Titles by team

Titles by country

References

External links
 Salonpas Cup official website

Volleyball competitions in Brazil
Recurring sporting events established in 2001
Recurring sporting events disestablished in 2008
2001 establishments in Brazil
2008 disestablishments in Brazil